Saint-Martin-d'Hères is a commune in the Isère department in southeastern France. Part of the Grenoble urban unit (agglomeration), it is the largest suburb of the city of Grenoble and is adjacent to it on the east.

History

The commune was created around 1100 where the church of St. Martin was located. During the middle ages it was administered at some points by the lords of the Castle of Gières, and at other times by the bishop of Grenoble, who had religious and seigniorial disputes with the former. The city remained a mostly rural area, until the 19th century, when it saw its first industrial developments with the opening of roads and railways. In the 1950s and the 1960s the city saw a "new era" with a significant demographic expansion caused by the installation of the University of Grenoble.

The city is limited at the north by the Isère. It is located in an area historically prone to flooding by it and by the Mogne and Sonnant streams, though the floods stopped since the construction of dykes and the channelization of the Mogne and Sonnant streams.

Population

Education
Saint-Martin-d'Hères is the home of the Université Grenoble Alpes main campus "Domaine Universitaire de Grenoble", a center of higher education in the region. The university features the Centre universitaire d'études françaises (CUEF). The CUEF offers second language instruction in French, and attracts students from a variety of foreign countries. Several universities in the United States sponsor study-abroad programs affiliated with the CUEF.

Personalities 
 Cristobal Huet - Goalie for the Chicago Blackhawks of the NHL
 Tristan Vautier - racing driver
 Suzanne Balguerie - French soprano died in Saint-Martin-d'Hères on 17 February 1973.
 Aurélien Panis - racing driver

Sights
 Arboretum Robert Ruffier-Lanche

See also
Communes of the Isère department

References

External links
 Official website

Communes of Isère
Isère communes articles needing translation from French Wikipedia